Aduuchiin Baatarkhüü (born 27 January 1956) is a Mongolian wrestler. He competed in the 1980 Summer Olympics.

References

External links 
 

1956 births
Living people
Mongolian male sport wrestlers
Olympic wrestlers of Mongolia
Wrestlers at the 1980 Summer Olympics
Asian Games medalists in wrestling
Asian Games silver medalists for Mongolia
Wrestlers at the 1978 Asian Games
Wrestlers at the 1990 Asian Games
Medalists at the 1978 Asian Games
Medalists at the 1990 Asian Games
20th-century Mongolian people
21st-century Mongolian people